Andre or André Brown may refer to:
Andre Brown (basketball) (born 1981), American basketball player
Andre Brown (volleyball) (born 1990), Canadian volleyball player
Andre Brown (running back) (born 1986), American football running back
Andre Brown (wide receiver) (born 1966), American football wide receiver
Doctor Dré (André Brown, born 1963), American radio personality and former MTV VJ